Håkan Georg Ericson (born 29 May 1960) is a Swedish football manager and the current manager of the Faroe Islands national team. During his playing career, he played for Åby IF, FK Kick and IK Sleipner. He is son of former Sweden national team coach Georg Ericson.

Honours

Manager
Sweden
 UEFA European Under-21 Championship: 2015

Managerial statistics

References

External links
 SvFF profile

1960 births
Living people
Swedish footballers
IK Sleipner players
Association footballers not categorized by position
Swedish football managers
Väsby IK managers
IFK Norrköping managers
Faroe Islands national football team managers
Swedish expatriate football managers
Expatriate football managers in the Faroe Islands